The 1981 Brown Bears football team was an American football team that represented Brown University during the 1981 NCAA Division I-A football season. Brown tied for fifth place in the Ivy League. 

In their ninth season under head coach John Anderson, the Bears compiled a 3–7 record and were outscored 250 to 153. T. Holcombe and D. Finneran were the team captains. 

The Bears' 2–5 conference record tied for fifth in the Ivy League standings. They were outscored 185 to 102 by Ivy opponents. 

This would be Brown's last season in the NCAA's top level of football competition. Shortly after the season ended, the NCAA reassigned all of the Ivy League teams to the second-tier Division I-AA, which would later be renamed the Football Championship Subdivision.

Brown played its home games at Brown Stadium in Providence, Rhode Island.

Schedule

References

Brown
Brown Bears football seasons
Brown Bears football